Jurgis Gedminas (born 1902, date of death unknown) was a Lithuanian cyclist. He competed in the individual road race at the 1928 Summer Olympics.

References

External links
 

1902 births
Year of death missing
Lithuanian male cyclists
Olympic cyclists of Lithuania
Cyclists at the 1928 Summer Olympics
Place of birth missing